The Cole Museum of Zoology is a university museum, part of the School of Biological Sciences at the University of Reading. It is located on the university's Whiteknights Campus in the town of Reading, Berkshire, England.

The collection was established in the early 20th century by Francis J. Cole (Professor of Zoology), Dr Nellie B. Eales (who catalogued the collection), and Mr Stoneman, from 1907 to 1939 when Cole retired. On Cole's death in 1959, the University also purchased his library of books, which are kept as a special collection in the main library.

A refurbishment of the museum was completed on 17 March 2004, enlarging the floor area to display a wider sample of the entire collection. It contains about 4,000 specimens of which about 400 are on display at any one time. Specimens are arranged in 27 cases in taxonomic sequence, thus enabling a complete tour of the diversity of the animal kingdom. Specimens include a male Indian circus elephant skeleton, a 5-metre reticulated python skeleton containing 400 vertebrae, a fossil of the largest spider to ever have lived, and a false killer whale skeleton.

See also
University of Reading

References

External links
Cole Museum of Zoology website

Museums with year of establishment missing
Natural history museums in England
Museums of the University of Reading
Zoology museums in the United Kingdom